Marjorie Bailey (née Turner; born 21 November 1947) is a Canadian sprinter. 

At the 1976 Summer Olympics she competed in the women's 100 metres and 200 metres. She made the semi-final round in both events. She ran the anchor leg of the 4 x 100 metre relay, which placed fourth and set a Canadian and Commonwealth record of 43.17. 

At the 1978 Commonwealth Games she won a silver medal in the 4 x 100 metres relay.

She won a bronze medal in the 100 metres and 4 x 100 metres relay at the 1975 Pan American Games, and finished fourth in the 200 metres. 

She finished fourth in the 200 metres, and sixth in the 100 metres at the 1974 British Commonwealth Games.

She was a descendant of black Loyalists (escaped slaves and freed men and women of African origin who, in the 1780, fled to Canada from America).

References

External links
 Canadian Olympians
 

1947 births
Living people
Athletes (track and field) at the 1976 Summer Olympics
Canadian female sprinters
Olympic track and field athletes of Canada
Athletes (track and field) at the 1966 British Empire and Commonwealth Games
Athletes (track and field) at the 1974 British Commonwealth Games
Athletes (track and field) at the 1978 Commonwealth Games
Commonwealth Games silver medallists for Canada
Commonwealth Games medallists in athletics
Athletes (track and field) at the 1975 Pan American Games
Pan American Games bronze medalists for Canada
Pan American Games medalists in athletics (track and field)
Black Canadian female track and field athletes
Black Nova Scotians
People from Shelburne County, Nova Scotia
Medalists at the 1975 Pan American Games
Olympic female sprinters
Medallists at the 1978 Commonwealth Games